Southwest High School is a public high school in Fort Worth, Texas, United States. It is one of fourteen traditional high schools in the Fort Worth Independent School District. The school has an enrollment of about 1,288 with a teaching staff of about 85. Southwest is classified as a 5A school in the state of Texas.

History
Southwest High School was established in the fall of 1967 and first opened in January 1968 when the student body transferred from temporary facilities at Paschal High School. Since 1968, thousands of changes have taken place in the school, city, state, country, and world. At the time it first opened its doors Southwest was in a new neighborhood adjacent to ranch land, serving a 20-year-old neighborhood that bordered its back fence. The student population reached the 2,000 mark within a year, peaking at approximately 2,400. Today Southwest is just one of the twenty one Fort Worth ISD high schools in a city of more than 800,000 residents. 

The school mascot was originally a Confederate Rebel and was later changed to the Raider because of complaints by community leaders and to better represent the diverse student body. The school's colors are cardinal red, royal blue, and white.

Raider athletics
The 2010 football season led to the Raiders' first playoff win in school history. The Raiders played Springtown High School in the first round and won by scoring a touchdown in the final seconds of the game 38-37. In 2012 the Raiders, advanced two rounds beating the Everman Bulldogs on a touchdown pass then advancing to meet Rider in Wichita Falls in a hard-fought game ending with Rider advancing.

In 2007, the Southwest Raider basketball team advanced to the state championship game against South Oak Cliff High School, but lost by a score of 80-77.

The Raiders baseball team has advanced to the playoffs for the last 20 consecutive years. 

The Southwest boys track team won their first regional championship in 2013 and made their third straight trip to the state meet.

Raider music

Choir

In the 2007-2008 and 2008-2009 school years, the Southwest High School A Cappella choir earned three first divisions on stage and two first divisions and one second division in sight singing for the University Interscholastic League's concert/sightsinging contest. In the 2010-2011 school year, Southwest's A Cappella choir was the only high school choir in FWISD to receive sweepstakes awards at the UIL competition. In the 2012-2013 school year, the A Capella choir was, again, the only FWISD high school choir to receive a sweepstakes at the UIL competition.

Band

In recent years, the Southwest Raider band has earned numerous first divisions and awards in UIL, TMEA, and other contests across the state. 

The Southwest Wind Ensemble placed third in the 2007 TMEA State Honor Band competition and fifth in the same contest in 2009 being the only band in class 4A to repeat finalist status in those two years. The competition was held among 4A finalists from the regions across the state of Texas. Southwest actually tied for second place but came in third after the tie-breaker rules were applied. This honor makes Southwest the first school ever in the history of the FWISD to advance to state finals in competition.

In the fall of 2009, the Southwest Raider Marching Band advanced to compete at the state level in San Antonio, Texas which is an accomplishment that no other FWISD school has ever achieved in the history of UIL. The band also advance to state competition on 2016 as well as 2018 as the only inner city high in the whole state of Texas. The following winter, the band set a new ISD record with 12 students advancing to state finals for individual competition.

Contemporary Academy of Music (CAM)

Students create original Rock, Hip-Hop, Pop, EDM, Gospel, and beyond in the state-of-the-art Southwest H.S. studio.

IPAAS
Students in this program develop a solid foundation in the basics of engineering and much more. Students explore engineering and technology in the dynamic field of energy, where they participate in oil and natural gas production computer simulations. They also go outside the classroom and observe a university's engineering department, meet with key individuals from various engineering fields, participate in engineering competitions, and hone skills in public speaking. Students use technology and software related to the engineering industry. The capstone of the program is the opportunity to earn a summer externship at the end of the junior year. It is an invaluable experience that provides important connections in the industry and the chance to earn college scholarships.

Early College High School
Students in this program will take a combination of high school and college level courses. Some classes will be on Southwest's campus and some classes will be at TCC's campus. Students will have the opportunity to earn an Associate of Arts degree from Tarrant County College.

Other organizations
 ACE
 African-American Culture Club
 Anime Club
 Asian Society
 Cheerleading
 Concerned Senior Girls
 Contemporary Academy of Music
 Dance/Drill Team
 Debate
 Energy Club
 French Club
 German Club
 GSA
 Hispanic Heritage Club
 JROTC
 Key Club
 Math Club
 Media Tech
 National Honor Society
 Natural Helpers
 Raider Connection
 Spanish Club
 Student Council (the only student council in the Fort Worth ISD that received the Outstanding Student Council award)
 Whiz Quiz

Notable alumni

Marshall Harris, artist and former NFL football player
Oliver Miller, former NBA basketball player
Nicole Kubes, Olympic Judo competitor
Phoebe Strole, cast member of the Broadway musical Spring Awakening
Brandin Lea, former lead singer of Flickerstick
Marcos A. Rodriguez, Cuban-born entrepreneur and broadcaster
Brandon Finnegan, professional baseball pitcher for the Cincinnati Reds
Wade Burleson, author, historian, and American minister
Brian Milner, former MLB Player

Feeder patterns

Elementary schools
 Bruce Shulkey
 J.T. Stevens
 Woodway
 Westcreek
 Greenbriar
 Hazel Harvey Peace

Middle schools
 Wedgwood 6th
 Wedgwood Middle

References

External links
 
 Southwest CAM

Public high schools in Fort Worth, Texas
Fort Worth Independent School District high schools
Educational institutions established in 1967
Public high schools in Texas